Thierry Mercier (born 1 May 1967) is a French curler and curling coach.

At the national level, he is a four-time French men's champion.

He participated in the demonstration curling events at the 1992 Winter Olympics, where the French men's team finished in sixth place.

Teams

Men's

Mixed

Mixed doubles

Record as a coach of national teams

Personal life
Thierry Mercier is from family of curlers: his mother Agnès Mercier is known French curler, many times French women's champion, she competed on 1988 Winter Olympics, number of World and European championships. Thierry's older sister is Annick Mercier, curler, many times French champion, she competed on 1988 and 1992 Winter Olympics, number of Worlds and Euros.

References

External links

 Video: 

Living people
1967 births

French male curlers
French curling champions
Curlers at the 1992 Winter Olympics
Olympic curlers of France
French curling coaches
Place of birth missing (living people)